Power to the edge refers to the ability of an organization to dynamically synchronize its actions; achieve command and control (C2) agility; and increase the speed of command over a robust, networked grid. The term is most commonly used in relation to military organizations, but it can equally be used in a civilian context.

"Power to the edge" is an information and organization management philosophy first articulated by the U.S. Department of Defense in a publication by Dr. David S. Alberts and Richard E. Hayes in 2003 titled: "Power to the Edge: Command...Control...in the Information Age." This book was published by the Command and Control Research Program and can be downloaded from the Program's website.

Principles
Power to the edge advocates the following:

Achieving situational awareness rather than creating a single operational picture
Self-synchronizing operations instead of autonomous operations
Information "pull" rather than broadcast information "push"
Collaborative efforts rather than individual efforts
Communities of Interest (COIs) rather than stovepipes
"Task, post, process, use" rather than "task, process, exploit, disseminate"
Handling information once rather than handling multiple data calls
Sharing data rather than maintaining private data
Persistent, continuous information assurance rather than perimeter, one-time security
Bandwidth on demand rather than bandwidth limitations
IP-based transport rather than circuit-based transport
Net-Ready KPP rather than interoperability KPP
Enterprise services rather than separate infrastructures
COTS based, net-centric capabilities rather than customized, platform-centric IT

Agility
The philosophy of power to the edge is aimed at achieving organizational agility. Such agility has six attributes:

Robustness: the ability to maintain effectiveness across a range of tasks, situations, and conditions
Resilience: the ability to recover from or adjust to misfortune, damage, or a destabilizing perturbation in the environment
Responsiveness: the ability to react to a change in the environment in a timely manner
Flexibility: the ability to employ multiple ways to succeed and the capacity to move seamlessly between them
Innovation: the ability to do new things and the ability to do old things in new ways
Adaptation: the ability to change work processes and the ability to change the organization

See also
Network-centric organization
Network-centric warfare
Network simulator

External links
Command and Control Research Program

References
Command and Control Research Program Website
Power to the Edge by Alberts and Hayes (2003)
Power to the Edge presentation by Dr. Margaret Myers, CIO-DOD
"Command and Control Implications of Network-Centric Warfare"

Management
Command and control
Net-centric